Wildscreen is a wildlife conservation charity based in Bristol, England.

The charity was founded in December 1987 from a trust which had operated since 1982, with the initial aim of encouraging and applauding excellence in the production of natural history films and television. The founders included Sir Peter Scott and Christopher Parsons OBE, former Head of the BBC Natural History Unit.

Wildscreen Film Festival

The Wildscreen Festival is the world's leading international festival about nature films. It is held biennially in October in Bristol, England.

The festival began in 1982. In 1994, it merged with a biennial wildlife symposium, previously held in the neighbouring city of Bath. At Wildscreen Festival wildlife filmmakers and broadcasters from different parts of the world met to view the latest productions, discuss issues of mutual interest, exchange ideas and compete for the Panda Awards.

Over the years since then the festival has significantly expanded its scale and content and the charity has also enlarged its remit, including by launching Arkive, a centralised collection of films and photographs of endangered species.

Wildscreen Festival 2020 
In preparation for the 2020 edition of the festival, Wildscreen announced the launch of the newly revamped Panda Awards, the highest honour in the global wildlife and environmental film industry. The 2020 festival will also feature an Official Selection screening programme and a new award to recognise best practice in sustainable production. David Allen, multi award-winning filmmaker, was also announced as Final Jury Chair.

The 2020 edition of the industry Festival takes place 19-23 October 2020 in Bristol, UK. The Official Selection screening programme will take place between 17-25 October and be open to both industry and public audiences

Panda Awards 
For 2020, the Panda Awards will recognise talent in the following categories; Cinematography, Editing, Emerging Talent (in both film and photography), Music, Photo Story, Producer/Director, Production Team, Scripted Narrative, Series and Sound. There will also be a new Sustainable Production award.

Official Selection 
To recognise the broad range of talent and creative storytellers, Wildscreen introduced an Official Selection competition for 2020.

Other initiatives
A physical collection of images, footage and information was started, which went online in 2003. This resource has grown to include over 16,000 species profiles and 100,000 images and videos from over 7,500 of the world's filmmakers, photographers and scientists. Arkive also contains topic pages that focus on various conservation issues, geographical regions and biological subjects.  Arkive was used by over a million people around the world each month.

In May 2015 Wildscreen launched their newest initiative, Wildscreen Exchange. This conservation initiative provides conservation organisations with access to images, videos and expertise. Wildscreen Exchange contains over 28,000 images and many hours of video that are being used all over the world for campaigns, education resources, community outreach, fundraising and online.

Management
Wildscreen is a registered charity under English law, governed by a board of 17 independent trustees, chaired by Dick Emery OBE, former CEO of UKTV. 

The chief executive is Richard Edwards, appointed in March 2011 to succeed Harriet Nimmo, who stepped down in January that year after 13 years with the charity, seven in the CEO role. Despite moving to South Africa, Nimmo retains a connection with the charity, in the advisory role of Wildscreen Strategic Director.

For the period April 2009 – March 2010 (which was a non-festival year for the biennial Wildscreen Festival), the charity's income was declared as £1,409,722, with expenditure of £1,417,362.

Wildscreen is a founder member of the Bristol Natural History Consortium, set up in 2004.

Patrons
HRH Prince Philip, Duke of Edinburgh
David Attenborough, Naturalist, broadcaster
Dr Sylvia Earle, Oceanographer
Professor E. O. Wilson, Harvard University
Dr George McGavin, Oxford University

References

External links
 Official Wildscreen site

Environmental organisations based in England
Organisations based in Bristol
Nature conservation organisations based in the United Kingdom
Charities based in Somerset